Randhe is a village in Parner taluka in Ahmednagar district of state of Maharashtra, India.

Religion
The majority of the population in the village is Hindu.
And Minority of the population in the village are Muslim And New Buddhism.
The Village Also Popular in District for wakefulness of Randhubai ( Ambika Mata ) Temple.

Economy
The majority of the population is involved in agriculture as their primary occupation.

See also
 Parner taluka
 Villages in Parner taluka

References 

Villages in Parner taluka
Villages in Ahmednagar district